Charles G. Bugbee (29 August 1887 – 18 October 1959) was a British water polo player who competed in the 1912 Summer Olympics, the 1920 Summer Olympics, and the 1924 Summer Olympics.

He was part of the British water polo team, which won gold medals in 1912 and 1920. He also participated in the 1924 Olympic water polo tournament, but the British team lost their first-round game. A City of London policeman, he served in the Great War as a leading mechanic in the Royal Naval Air Service, from May 1915 until April 1918 and then in the R.A.F. until 1919. In addition to his Olympic medals, he was awarded the 1914/15 Star, British War and Victory Medals, and the 1911 City of London Police Coronation Medal.

See also
 Great Britain men's Olympic water polo team records and statistics
 List of Olympic champions in men's water polo
 List of Olympic medalists in water polo (men)

References

External links

 

1887 births
1959 deaths
British male water polo players
English Olympic medallists
Olympic water polo players of Great Britain
Olympic gold medallists for Great Britain
Water polo players at the 1912 Summer Olympics
Water polo players at the 1920 Summer Olympics
Water polo players at the 1924 Summer Olympics
Olympic medalists in water polo
Medalists at the 1920 Summer Olympics
Medalists at the 1912 Summer Olympics